In Unicode, the Sumero-Akkadian Cuneiform script is covered in three blocks in the Supplementary Multilingual Plane (SMP):
 U+12000–U+123FF Cuneiform
 U+12400–U+1247F Cuneiform Numbers and Punctuation
 U+12480–U+1254F Early Dynastic Cuneiform

The sample glyphs in the chart file published by the Unicode Consortium show the characters in their Classical Sumerian form (Early Dynastic period, mid 3rd millennium BCE). The characters as written during the 2nd and 1st millennia BCE, the era during which the vast majority of cuneiform texts were written, are considered font variants of the same characters.

Character inventory and ordering

The final proposal for Unicode encoding of the script was submitted by two cuneiform scholars working with an experienced Unicode proposal writer in June 2004.
The base character inventory is derived from the list of Ur III signs compiled by the Cuneiform Digital Library Initiative of UCLA based on the inventories of Miguel Civil, Rykle Borger (2003), and Robert Englund. Rather than opting for a direct ordering by glyph shape and complexity, according to the numbering of an existing catalogue, the Unicode order of glyphs was based on the Latin alphabetic order of their 'main' Sumerian transliteration as a practical approximation.

Of the 907 signs listed by Borger (2003), some 200 have no encoding at a single code point. Conversely, a number of combinations considered reducible by Borger were assigned unique code points. These differences are due to the difficulty of establishing what represents a single character in cuneiform, and indeed most of Borger's items not encoded have straightforward etymological decomposition. There are still quite a number of universally recognized signs missing, and criticism has been voiced to the effect that the encoding "disregards an important part of the accumulated knowledge of generations of assyriologists about what actually function as single signs in normal texts, and are reflected in the traditional sign lists, most recently and comprehensively Borger's Mesopotamische Zeichenliste". For example, there are signs written as ligatures of varying constituent signs, such as KURUM7 (Borger 2003 no. 729) that was written IGI.NÍG in early times, but later IGI.ERIM. Since there is no code point for KURUM7, the sign must be expressed as either IGI.NÍG (U+12146 U+1243C) or IGI.ERIM (U+12146 U+1209F) depending on the shape of the glyph, in violation of the basic principle of Unicode to encode characters, not glyphs. While those signs can in principle still be added by a "Cuneiform Extended" range in the future, as has been done for a number of other scripts ("Latin Extended" etc.), their absence as of Unicode 7.0 means that the standard's usability for the encoding of actual texts is limited.

Rather than opting for an ordering by glyph shape and complexity, the Unicode order of characters is the Latin alphabet order of their "main" Sumerian transliteration (placing signs on Š-, transliterated as SH-, between SAR and SI). In most (but not all) cases, the "etymological" decomposition of originally complex signs ("ligatures") has been chosen, even if the sign's most familiar value is another.

List of signs

The following table allows matching of Borger's 1981 and 2003 numbering with Unicode characters 
The "primary" transliteration column has the glyphs' Sumerian values as given by the official glyph name, slightly modified here for legibility by including traditional assyriological symbols such as "x" rather than "TIMES". The exact Unicode names can be unambiguously recovered by prefixing, 
"CUNEIFORM [NUMERIC] SIGN", replacing "TIMES" for "x", "PLUS" for "+" and "OVER" for "/", "ASTERISK" for "*", "H" for "Ḫ", "SH" for "Š", and switching to uppercase.

Sumero-Akkadian Cuneiform

Code chart
Sumero-Akkadian Cuneiform script was added to the Unicode Standard in July, 2006 with the release of version 5.0.

The Unicode block for Sumero-Akkadian Cuneiform is U+12000–U+123FF:

History
The following Unicode-related documents record the purpose and process of defining specific characters in the Cuneiform block:

See also
List of cuneiform signs

References

Citations

Bibliography
Rykle Borger, Assyrisch-Babylonische Zeichenliste, 2nd ed., Neukirchen-Vluyn (1981)
Rykle Borger, Mesopotamisches Zeichenlexikon, Münster (2003).
Michael Everson, Karljürgen Feuerherm, Steve Tinney, "Final proposal to encode the Cuneiform script in the SMP of the UCS", ISO/IEC JTC1/SC2/WG2 N2786 (2004).

External links
cuneiformsigns.org  by Lloyd Anderson
 Cuneiform Unicode.org chart (PDF)
 Cuneiform Numbers and Punctuation Unicode.org chart (PDF)

Font packages
Akkadian (reproduces the Sumerian (3rd millennium BC) glyphs given in the Unicode (reference chart), by George Douros.
FreeIdgSerif (branched off FreeSerif), encodes some 390 Old Assyrian (2nd millennium BC) glyphs used in Hittite cuneiform. 
Noto Sans Cuneiform (Encodes all three Cuneiform blocks. Distributed under SIL Open Font License)
Segoe UI Historic (Comes pre-installed on Windows 10 and later)

Cuneiform
Cuneiform